Aelita is a 1924 silent film.

Aelita may also refer to:

Arts and entertainment
 Aelita (novel), a 1923 novel by Alexei Tolstoy and the main female character of the novel
 Aelita Prize, a Soviet/Russian award for science fiction writers
 Aelita (convention), a Soviet/Russian science fiction fandom convention where the prize
 Aelita Schaeffer, a main character in the French animated television series Code Lyoko and its live-action/CGI sequel series Code Lyoko: Evolution
 "Aelita", an episode of French animated television series Code Lyoko
 Aelita (Tied & Tickled Trio album), 2007
 Aelita, a character in the 2014 video game Lifeless Planet
 Ælita, 2014 album by Mando Diao

Other uses
 Aelita Software Corporation, an American company which manufactured computer and communication products
 Aelita (synthesizer), a music synthesizer made in the USSR in the 1980s

See also
Aleta (disambiguation)
Alita (disambiguation)
Elita (disambiguation)